The Vekil-Harrach or Hadžijska mosque is a mosque in the city of Sarajevo, Bosnia and Herzegovina. It is located in Alifakovac, a neighborhood in Babića bašća local community, one of the oldest urban settlements in Sarajevo.

History
Built between 1541 and 1561 by Gazi Husrev-beg's quartermaster, Vekil-Harrach after whom it was originally named. It was used by pilgrims (hadžije) in the city before their joinery Mecca from here, it was named the Pilgrim's mosque.

Architecture
It is fenced by a wall, inside which there is a stone fountain, which was renewed at the beginning of the 19th century by Sarajevo judge (kadija) Mustafa Fevzi, which is what the inscription is about.

See also 
 Timeline of Islamic history
 Islamic architecture
 Islamic art
 List of mosques

References 

Mosques in Sarajevo
Religious buildings and structures completed in 1561
Centar, Sarajevo
Attacks on religious buildings and structures during the Bosnian War
Ottoman mosques in Bosnia and Herzegovina
16th-century mosques
1561 establishments in the Ottoman Empire